John Mandt Nelson (October 10, 1870 – January 29, 1955) was a U.S. Representative from Wisconsin.

Early life
John Mandt Nelson was born on October 10, 1870, in Burke, Wisconsin. Nelson attended the public schools and graduated from the University of Wisconsin–Madison in 1892. He graduated from the law department of the University of Wisconsin–Madison in 1896, and pursued a postgraduate course from 1901 to 1903.

Career
He was the superintendent of the schools in Dane County from 1892 to 1894. He worked as a bookkeeper in the office of the secretary of state from 1894 to 1897. He worked as editor of The State, published in Madison, Wisconsin, in 1897 and 1898. Nelson then worked as correspondent in the state treasury from 1898 to 1902.

Nelson was elected as a Republican to the Fifty-ninth Congress to fill the vacancy caused by the death of Henry C. Adams. He replaced Adams as the representative of Wisconsin's 2nd congressional district and was reelected for the next three congresses in the same role from September 4, 1906 till March 3, 1913. From the 63rd Congress he represented Wisconsin's 3rd congressional district and was reelected to the following 64th and 65th Congresses as well from March 4, 1913 till March 3, 1919. On April 5, 1917, he voted against declaring war on Germany. He was an unsuccessful candidate during the 1918 Congressional election.

After missing one term in congress, Nelson was elected once again as Wisconsin's 3rd congressional district representative to the Sixty-seventh and to the five succeeding Congresses (March 4, 1921 – March 3, 1933). He served as chairman of the Committee on Elections No. 2 Sixty-eighth Congress. He served on the Committee on Invalid Pensions (Seventy-first Congress). He was an unsuccessful candidate for renomination in 1932 to the Seventy-third Congress. He retired from business and political activities.

Personal life
Nelson died on January 29, 1955, in Madison, Wisconsin following a long illness. He was interred in Forest Hill Cemetery in Madison.

References

External links

1870 births
1955 deaths
People from Burke, Wisconsin
Editors of Wisconsin newspapers
University of Wisconsin–Madison alumni
University of Wisconsin Law School alumni
Republican Party members of the United States House of Representatives from Wisconsin